Ischnochiton torri, commonly known as Torr's ischnochiton, is a species of chiton in the genus Ischnochiton that lives under rocks in the intertidal and shallow subtidal waters of southern Australia. It is commonly found throughout its wide range, and is often found with Ischnochiton cariosus. Its back has an orange rim and a brown-scaled covering, with a cream-coloured stripe along its axis.

References

Chitons of Australia
Ischnochitonidae